Karadağ is a neighbourhood in the Narman District of Erzurum Province in Turkey.

References

Villages in Narman District